Victor Segalen (14 January 1878 – 21 May 1919) was a French naval doctor, ethnographer, archeologist, writer, poet, explorer, art-theorist, linguist and literary critic.

He was born in Brest. He studied medicine and graduated at the Navy School of medicine ('Santé Navale') in Bordeaux. He traveled and lived in Polynesia (1903–1905) and China (1909–1914 and 1917). He died by accident in a forest in Huelgoat, Northern Brittany, France ("under mysterious circumstances") and reputedly with an open copy of Hamlet by his side.

Legacy 
In 1934, the French state inscribed his name on the walls of the Panthéon because of his sacrifice for his country during World War I.

He gave his name to the Victor Segalen Bordeaux 2 University of medicine, literature and social sciences in Bordeaux under the Academy of Bordeaux, and to the Faculty of Arts and Social Sciences of Brest where he was born, and the French International School of Hong Kong.

Personal life 
Victor Segalen married on June 2, 1905 in Brest Yvonne Hébert (1884-1963), with whom he had three children:  Yvon (1906), Annie (1912) and Ronan (1913). 

Some western scholars of Chinese art, starting with Victor Segalen, use the word "chimera" generically to refer to winged leonine or mixed species quadrupeds, such as bixie, tianlu, and even qilin.

Works 

 L'observation médicale chez les écrivains naturalistes, thesis, Bordeaux, 1902 (document électronique).
 Les Synesthésies et l'école symboliste, 1902.
 Vers les sinistrés, 1903.
 Gauguin dans son dernier décor, 1904.
 Le Double Rimbaud, 1906.
 Dans un monde sonore, 1907.
 Voix mortes : musique maori, 1907.
 Les Immémoriaux (under the pseudonym Max Anély), 1907.
 Stèles, 1912 ; new edition, presented by Simon Leys, Éditions de la Différence, coll. " Orphée ", Paris, 1989. Read online.
 Peintures, Chez Georges Crès et Cie, 1916.
 Hommage à Gauguin, 1918.
 Dossier pour une Fondation Sinologique, Rougerie, 1986.
 Essai sur l'exotisme, Fata Morgana, 1978 ; nouvelle édition, Livre de poche, coll. biblio-essais, 1986.
 Dans un monde sonore, Fata Morgana, 2010 ; nouvelle édition.

Posthumous publications :
 Thibet (publié partiellement en 1963 puis intégralement en 1979).
 Le Siège de l'Âme, 1921.
 Orphée-Roi, 1921.
 René Leys, 1922.
 Mission archéologique en Chine (in collaboration with Gilbert de Voisins and Jean Lartigue), 1923–1924.
 Odes, 1926.
 Équipée. De Pékin aux marches tibétaines…, 1929.
 Voyage au pays du réel, 1929.
 Lettres de Chine, 1967.
  La Grande Statuaire chinoise, suivi de Les origines de la grande statuaire en Chine 1972.
 A Dreuz an Arvor, 1973.
 Siddharta, 1974.
 Briques et Tuiles, Fata Morgana, 1975. 
 Journal des îles, 1978.
 Le Fils du ciel : chronique des jours souverains, 1985.
 Essai sur soi-même, 1986.
 Le Fils du Ciel, 1995.
 Journal de voyage, 1995.
 Le Maître-du-Jouir, 1995.
 La marche du feu, 1995.
 Pensers païens, 1995.
 Hommage à Saint-Pol-Roux, 1995.
 Entretiens avec Debussy, 1995.
 Gustave Moreau, maître imagier de l'orphisme, 1995.
 Quelques musées par le monde, 1995.
 Essai sur l'exotisme, 1995.
 Essai sur le mystérieux, 1995.
 Imaginaires, 1995.
 Un grand fleuve, 1995.
 Briques et tuiles, 1995.
 Feuilles de route, 1995.
 Correspondance, 2004 (compilation dirigée par Henry Bouillier et Annie Joly-Segalen)
 Un grand fleuve, préface de Jean Esponde, éd. Atelier de l'agneau, 2006.
 Les Marquises, extrait de Journal des Îles, suivi de Cyclone dans les îles Tuamotu, préface de Jean Esponde, éd. Atelier de l'agneau, 2011.

Archaeological missions :
 Rapport de la Mission archéologique Victor Segalen, 1917
 Le tombeau du fils du roi de Wou – Ve siècle avant notre ère, 1922
 Rapport de la Mission archéologique en Lartigue, Segalen et de Voisins, 1923–1924
 Chine, la grande statuaire, suivi de Les origines de la statuaire de Chine (publiée en 1972)

Works about Segalen
 Henry Bouillier: Victor Segalen (Mercure de France, 1961)
 Gilles Manceron: Segalen
 Charles Forsdick: Victor Segalen and the Aesthetics of Diversity (Oxford University Press, 2000)
Wang Tao and Denis Thouard, "Making New Classics: The Archaeology of Luo Zhenyu and Victor Segalen", in S. Humphreys and R. Wagner (eds), Modernity's Classics. Transcultural Research – Heidelberg Studies on Asia and Europe in a Global Context (Springer: Berlin, Heidelberg, 2013)

References

External links

 Website about Victor Segalen 
 Bibliography on Victor Segalen 
 
 
 Stèles 古今碑錄 (complete French text and online book of Chinese sources)

1878 births
1919 deaths
Writers from Brest, France
French poets
Poets from Brittany
French medical writers
French travel writers
French sinologists
French male poets
French male non-fiction writers
French physicians